The 1989 French Grand Prix was a Formula One motor race held at Paul Ricard on 9 July 1989. It was the seventh race of the 1989 Formula One World Championship.

The 80-lap race was won from pole position by local driver Alain Prost, driving a McLaren-Honda, with Englishman Nigel Mansell second in a Ferrari and Italian Riccardo Patrese third in a Williams-Renault.

Pre-race

Four drivers would make their F1 debuts at this race. Frenchman Jean Alesi, then contesting the Formula 3000 Championship, replaced Michele Alboreto at Tyrrell when the team took on Camel as its major sponsor, clashing with Alboreto's Marlboro sponsorship. Another Frenchman, Éric Bernard, replaced Yannick Dalmas at Larrousse, Dalmas still suffering the effects of Legionnaires' disease. Lotus test driver Martin Donnelly took the place of Derek Warwick at Arrows for this race after Warwick injured his back in a karting accident.

Finally, McLaren test driver Emanuele Pirro replaced Johnny Herbert at Benetton after it was decided that Herbert needed more time to recover from the leg and ankle injuries he had sustained in the Formula 3000 race at Brands Hatch in 1988. Benetton debuted their B189 car, with the new Ford HB engine, at Paul Ricard, Alessandro Nannini driving this car while Pirro drove the older, DFR-powered B188.

Qualifying

Pre-qualifying report
For the first time, both Onyx cars made it into the main qualifying sessions, as Bertrand Gachot and Stefan Johansson came first and second in pre-qualifying. It was Gachot's first pre-qualifying success in seven attempts. Alex Caffi in the Dallara was a few hundredths of a second back in third, and Stefano Modena in the Brabham was the fourth and last prequalifier, marginally faster than the Osella of Nicola Larini.

The other entrants who failed to pre-qualify on the Friday morning were Modena's Brabham team-mate Martin Brundle in sixth, the second time in a row the British driver had failed at this stage. Volker Weidler was seventh in the Rial, his seventh successive failure to pre-qualify. Both Zakspeeds again missed out, Bernd Schneider eighth, and Aguri Suzuki eleventh. Ninth was Piercarlo Ghinzani in the second Osella, the Italian's seventh consecutive pre-qualifying failure, and Pierre-Henri Raphanel was tenth in his Coloni. Gregor Foitek's EuroBrun and Joachim Winkelhock's AGS were bottom of the timesheets. Winkelhock left AGS after this weekend having failed to pre-qualify at any Grand Prix thus far, to be replaced by the recently-sacked Larrousse-Lola driver Yannick Dalmas.

Pre-qualifying classification

Qualifying report
For the second successive race, Alain Prost narrowly beat McLaren teammate Ayrton Senna to pole position, this time by 0.025 seconds. On the second row were Nigel Mansell in the Ferrari and Nannini in the new Benetton, and on the third row were Thierry Boutsen in the Williams and Gerhard Berger in the second Ferrari. The Larrousse team had also sacked Philippe Alliot prior to the race only to then re-hire him; he responded by qualifying seventh, with the second Williams of Riccardo Patrese alongside him on the fourth row. The top ten was completed by Jonathan Palmer in the Tyrrell and Maurício Gugelmin in the March.

The Onyxes continued their good form from pre-qualifying, with Gachot taking 11th on the grid and Johansson 13th. Debutants Donnelly, Bernard and Alesi were 14th, 15th and 16th respectively, with Pirro 24th in the older Benetton. The other two pre-qualifiers, Modena and Caffi, were 22nd and 26th respectively, Caffi edging out teammate Andrea de Cesaris for the last grid spot.

Qualifying classification

Race

Race report
At the first start, Senna led into the first corner from Prost, while behind them, Gugelmin locked his brakes and veered into Boutsen's Williams and Berger's Ferrari. The March launched into the air and flipped upside down, also knocking off Mansell's rear wing. The race was immediately red-flagged, a shaken Gugelmin taking the restart from the pit lane along with Mansell and Donnelly.

At the restart, Senna suffered a differential failure, leaving Prost to lead every lap of the race. Berger ran second in the early stages, ahead of Nannini, Boutsen and Ivan Capelli in the second March, before spinning on lap 12 and eventually retiring with a clutch failure. Boutsen developed gearbox problems while Nannini suffered a suspension failure on lap 41, promoting Capelli to second for three laps before his engine failed. This left Alesi second on his debut, ahead of Patrese and Mansell, before he pitted for tyres. Alliot and Gachot also ran in the top six before Alliot suffered an engine failure and Gachot pitted with a flat battery. On lap 61, Patrese spun under pressure from Mansell, allowing the Englishman through into second.

Prost took the chequered flag 44 seconds ahead of Mansell, with Patrese a further 22 seconds back. Alesi was fourth, seven seconds behind Patrese and the last driver on the lead lap, with Johansson scoring Onyx's first points in fifth and Olivier Grouillard in the Ligier scoring his only point for sixth. Pirro was ninth, Bernard 11th and Donnelly 12th, while Gugelmin recovered from his accident by setting the fastest race lap.

With the win, Prost extended his lead over Senna in the Drivers' Championship to 11 points.

Race classification

Championship standings after the race

Drivers' Championship standings

Constructors' Championship standings

References

French Grand Prix
French Grand Prix
Grand Prix
French Grand Prix